Alexander Theodor von Middendorff (tr. ; 18 August 1815 – 24 January 1894) was a zoologist and explorer of Baltic German and Estonian extraction. He is known for his expedition 1843–45 to the extreme north and east of Siberia, describing the effects of permafrost on the spread of animals and plants.

Early life 
Middendorff's mother Sophia Johanson (1782–1868), the daughter of an Estonian farmer, had been sent to Saint Petersburg for education by her parents. There she met with the future director of the St. Petersburg Pedagogical Institute, Theodor Johann von Middendorff (1776–1856), whose father was a Baltic German pastor in Karuse, Estonia. As the two young people came from different social ranks and were unable to marry each other, their daughter Anette (b. 1809) and son Alexander were born out of wedlock. Alexander was born on 18 August 1815 in St. Petersburg, but could not be baptized until six months later in the Estonian Lutheran Congregation of St. Petersburg, as the German Lutheran Congregation of St. Petersburg had not agreed to perform the baptism. In the accompanying paperwork, Middendorff's parents registered themselves as a married couple. In order to escape the attention of the public, the mother and son returned to Estonia, where they settled at the Pööravere Mansion. Only in 1824, when the young Middendorff was ready to go to school, was his status legitimized when his parents finally married. (Note: Although his father Theodor was Baltic German, Middendorff's middle name is sometimes spelled as "Theodorowitsch",
a German corruption of the Russian patronymic Федорович (Fyodorovich); "-ovich" meaning "the son of" the person (father) whose name precedes it.)

Education 
Middendorff received his early education from tutors in Reval and at a gymnasium in Saint Petersburg. From 1832 he pursued a medical degree at the Imperial University of Dorpat where his professors included Georg Friedrich Parrot, Nikolay Ivanovich Pirogov, Hermann Martin Asmuss, and Alexander Friedrich von Hueck. Middendorff graduated in 1837 with a dissertation (written in Latin) on polyps in the bronchi. He then undertook further studies at the Humboldt University of Berlin, University of Erlangen-Nuremberg, University of Vienna, and University of Breslau.

Explorer and scientist 

In 1839, under the patronage of Karl Ernst von Baer, he  became assistant professor of zoology at Kiev University.

In the summer of 1840, Baer asked Middendorff to join his second expedition to Novaya Zemlya (the first one took place in 1837). Due to stormy conditions the expedition failed to reach Novaya Zemlya, but Baer and Middendorff explored Russian and Norwegian Lapland, as well as the Barents and White Seas. Middendorff was tasked with crossing on foot the Kola Peninsula and mapping the peninsula from Kola to Kandalaksha while collecting zoological and botanical material.

Baer suggested Middendorff to the St Petersburg Academy of Sciences as leader of a follow-up expedition and supplied extended expedition instructions in 1842/43 in a print-ready typescript. They comprised over 200 pages and a permafrost map of Eurasia. From 1843 to 1845, Middendorff travelled with these instructions, to the Taymyr Peninsula and then along the coast of the Sea of Okhotsk and entered the lower Amur River valley (which at this time was Chinese territory). He published his findings in Reise in den äußersten Norden und Osten Sibiriens (Travels in the extreme north and east of Siberia) in German (1848–1875), which included an account of the effects of permafrost on the spread of animals and plants. He also wrote Die Isepiptesen Russlands (1855), an account of bird migration in Russia, and a monograph on molluscs, Beiträge zu einer Malacozoologia Rossica (1847–1849), in which he coined the term radula.

Baer's  expedition instructions had the German title „Materialien zur Kenntniss des unvergänglichen Boden-Eises in Sibirien“ (=materials for the knowledge of the perennial ground ice in Siberia). Although print-ready in 1943, the text remained lost for more than 150 years. Thus in 2001 the discovery and annotated publication of the typescript in the library archives of the University of Giessen was a scientific sensation. The full text of the expedition instructions is available online (234 pages). The editor Lorenz King added to the facsimile reprint a preface in English, two colour permafrost maps of Eurasia. The text is introduced with detailed comments and references on additional 66 pages written by the Estonian historian Erki Tammiksaar.

In 1870 Middendorff visited the Baraba steppe and in 1878 the Fergana Valley.

Personal life and death
Middendorf was married to Hedwig. His son Ernst von Middendorff was also an ornithologist.

Middendorf died in 1894 at Hellenorm, Kreis Dorpat, in Governorate of Livonia, then Russian Empire  present-day Valga County, Estonia.

Legacy

Middendorff's grasshopper warbler, Cape Middendorff  of Novaya Zemlya, Kodiak bear (Ursus arctos middendorffi), and Middendorff Bay of the Taymyr Peninsula are named after him. He coined the term aufeis.

See also
List of Baltic German scientists

References

Further reading
 E. Tammiksaar, I. Stone, "Alexander von Middendorff and his expedition to Siberia (1842–1845)", Polar Record 43 (226): 193–216 (2007)
Barbara and Richard Mearns, Audubon to Xantus, The Lives of Those Commemorated in North American Bird Names, 

1815 births
1894 deaths
Scientists from Tallinn
Baltic-German people
Estonian explorers
Explorers from the Russian Empire
Russian ornithologists
Russian zoologists
University of Tartu alumni
Humboldt University of Berlin alumni
University of Erlangen-Nuremberg alumni
University of Vienna alumni
University of Breslau alumni
Privy Councillor (Russian Empire)
Full members of the Saint Petersburg Academy of Sciences
Honorary members of the Saint Petersburg Academy of Sciences
Explorers from Saint Petersburg